Benjamin Franklin Public School Number 36 is a historic school building located at Indianapolis, Indiana.  It was built in 1896, and is a two-story, cubical, Romanesque Revival style brick building with a two-story addition built in 1959. It sits on a raised basement and has a hipped roof with extended eaves.  The front facade features a central tower and large, fully arched, triple window. The building has been converted to apartments.

It was listed on the National Register of Historic Places in 2003.

References

School buildings on the National Register of Historic Places in Indiana
Romanesque Revival architecture in Indiana
School buildings completed in 1896
Schools in Indianapolis
National Register of Historic Places in Indianapolis